A flip clock (also known as a "flap clock") is an electromechanical, digital time keeping device with the time indicated by numbers that are sequentially revealed by a split-flap display. The study, collection and repair of flip clocks is termed horopalettology (from horology - the study and measurement of time and palette - and the Italian "orologio a palette" - Italian for "flip clock"). People interested in the collection, restoration, buying and selling of flip clocks are known as horopalettologists.

Method of operation

An electric motor (often synchronous, if directly connected to the AC line) turns two sets of wheels continuously via a reduction gear train: the faster at a rate of 1 revolution per hour, the slower at a rate of 1 revolution per 24 hours. The wheels move continuously, not in steps.

The faster wheel has connected to it a ring of 60 flat plastic leaves. On the leaves are printed numerals so that, when a person holds two adjacent leaves apart like an open book, the two open leaves spell out a numeral, and flipping a leaf down increases the number shown by 1 unit. The "book" is opened vertically, and its pages form a ring. This ring is put into position and rotated so that one page falls each minute, showing a new number for the minutes.

The slower wheel has connected to it a similar ring of leaves, only there are 48 leaves on this ring. These leaves have hour numbers printed on them. There are two of each hour, like this: 12am, 12am, 1am, 1am, 2am, 2am, ... 11pm, 11pm in a 12-hour clock, and 0, 0, 1, 1, 2, 2, ... 23, 23 in a 24-hour clock. Having two sets of leaves for each hour also allows the clock to alternate between 12- and 24-hour display, every half hour, like this: 12am, 0h, 1am, 1h, 2am, 2h, ... 11pm, 23h. One leaf falls each half-hour, at approximately 25 and 55 minutes after the hour. A different design features 60 leaves with the numbers 1 to 12 repeated in fives, each leaf falling after 12 minutes. The disadvantage of this is that 24-hour clocks cannot use this design, nor there is a way to show "AM" or "PM" information in a 12-hour design.

Minute leaves 45 through 59 have a small tooth on their left edges, pointing toward the hour leaves. The purpose of this tooth is as follows: at 45 minutes after the hour, the tooth pushes a small hook that protrudes into the hour wheel area. This hook will catch any falling hour leaf (as mentioned above, it falls from its metal tab a few minutes before the hour) until it is released by the minute leaf's fall at the top of the hour.

Daylight saving time 
Many vintage digital clocks with split flap displays cannot be wound back, as the flip mechanism operates only in one direction. Instead they must be either wound forward 23 hours to achieve the effect of winding back 1 hour at the end of daylight saving time or the clock may be stopped (by disconnecting it from power) for 1 hour. However, on some newer clocks, forward and backward time setting is possible. GE clocks sometimes had this feature.

Gallery

See also 
 Cifra 3
 Digital sundial

External links
 FlipClockFans.com - Flip Clock Aficionado Forum

Clock designs